The 1956–57 Indiana Hoosiers men's basketball team represented Indiana University. Their head coach was Branch McCracken, who was in his 16th year. The team played its home games in The Fieldhouse in Bloomington, Indiana, and was a member of the Big Ten Conference.

The Hoosiers finished the regular season with an overall record of 14–8 and a conference record of 10–4, finishing 1st in the Big Ten Conference. Despite being Big Ten Conference Champions, Indiana was not invited to participate in any postseason tournament.

Roster

Schedule/Results

|-
!colspan=8| Regular Season
|-

References

Indiana Hoosiers
Indiana Hoosiers men's basketball seasons
1956 in sports in Indiana
1957 in sports in Indiana